A seafood restaurant is a restaurant that specializes in seafood cuisine and seafood dishes, such as fish and shellfish. Dishes may include freshwater fish. The concept may focus upon the preparation and service of fresh seafood, (as opposed to frozen products). Some seafood restaurants also provide retail sales of seafood that consumers take home to prepare. Seafood restaurants may have a marine-themed decor, with decorations such as fish nets, nautical images and buoys. Fare can vary due to seasonality in fish availability and in the fishing industry. Seafood restaurants may offer additional non-seafood items, such as chicken and beef dishes.

Types
Upscale and midscale seafood restaurants may offer more selections compared to quick-service restaurants. Some are located nearby or on a waterfront.

Fare
Fare in seafood restaurants may include fresh and frozen fish, shellfish, crawfish, shrimp, crab, lobster, mussels and oysters. Some have a raw bar area where raw shellfish products are prepared, such as raw oysters.

See also

 List of seafood restaurants
 Calabash, North Carolina – dubbed the "Seafood Capital of the World" because of the town's offering of "Calabash-style" seafood restaurants
 Cantonese seafood restaurants typically use a large dining room layout, have ornate designs, and specialize in seafood such as expensive Chinese-style lobsters, crabs, prawns, clams, and oysters, all kept live in fish tanks until preparation.
 Gampo-eup – an eup or a town of Gyeongju in South Korea, Gampo Harbor has over 240 seafood restaurants.
 George – an American lobster owned briefly by the City Crab and Seafood restaurant in New York City. Captured in December 2008, he was released back into the wild in January 2009.
 List of barbecue restaurants
 Lists of restaurants
 List of fish and chip restaurants
 List of fish dishes
 List of oyster bars
 List of seafood dishes
 List of sushi restaurants
 National Federation of Fish Friers
 National Fisheries Institute – member companies consist of all levels of business involved in seafood, from fishing vessel operators to seafood restaurants
 Steakhouse

References

External links
 

Seafood restaurants
Restaurants by type